The Christopher H. Smith House, also known as the Queen of the Cumberland, is a historic house in Clarksville, Tennessee. It was built in the Antebellum era for a tobacco merchant. It is listed on the National Register of Historic Places.

History
The house was built in 1856-1859 for Christopher Smith, a tobacco merchant. The house remained in the Smith family until 1919.

The house was acquired by the city of Clarskville and repurposed as a community center in 1986.

Architectural significance
The house was designed in the Greek Revival and Italianate architectural styles. It has been listed on the National Register of Historic Places since March 8, 1988.

References

Houses on the National Register of Historic Places in Tennessee
National Register of Historic Places in Montgomery County, Tennessee
Greek Revival architecture in Tennessee
Italianate architecture in Tennessee
Houses completed in 1859